The Clovelly Crocodiles was formed in 1918 under the auspices of the Eastern Suburbs Junior League. The club's colours are red, white and blue.

See also

Sydney Roosters Juniors
List of rugby league clubs in Australia

References

External links
 

Rugby league teams in Sydney
Rugby clubs established in 1918
1918 establishments in Australia